The 2014–15 LPB season was the 82nd season of the Liga Portuguesa de Basquetebol (LPB), the highest professional basketball league in Portugal. Three-time defending champions Benfica secured their 26th title after beating Vitória de Guimarães 3–0 in the playoff finals.

Teams
Benfica was the defending champion and secured its 26th league title.

Illiabum Clube, runner-up of the 2013–14 Proliga, promoted to LPB after the resignation of champion Dragon Force.

Standings

Playoffs

References

External links
FPB website 

Liga Portuguesa de Basquetebol seasons
Portuguese
LPB